Andreas Haider-Maurer was the defending champion but decided not to participate.
Tommy Robredo won the title by defeating Gastão Elias 6–3, 6–2 in the final.

Seeds

Draw

Finals

Top half

Bottom half

References
 Main Draw
 Qualifying Draw

Citta di Caltanissetta - Singles
2012 Singles